Stephen F. Hale (born Stephen Fowler Hale; January 31, 1816 – July 18, 1862) was an American politician who served as a Deputy from Alabama to the Provisional Congress of the Confederate States from 1861 to 1862. In July 1862, he died of wounds received at the Battle of Gaines' Farm, in Virginia.

Early life and education
Hale was born on January 31, 1816, in Crittenden County, Kentucky. His father, William Hale, was a Union Baptist minister, a South Carolinian, who married a Miss Elizabeth Manahan of the same state. He graduated from Cumberland University, came to Alabama around 1837, and taught school in Greene County for a year. He read law while teaching school, and in 1839 graduated from the law school at Lexington, Kentucky. Locating in Eutaw, he practiced at different times in association with Alexander Graham and T.C. Clarke.

Political career
In 1843 he was elected to the State legislature from Greene County. After serving his term in the house, he met and married Mary Kirksey on June 12, 1844 and retired to private life until the outbreak of the Mexican War in 1846, when he volunteered and was elected lieutenant of a company. He served in Mexico until the conclusion of peace in 1848, he then returned to Eutaw to his law practice. He was the nominee of his party for congress in 1853, but was defeated; was elected to the legislature again in 1857; was re-elected in 1859; and was Grand Master of the Grand Lodge of Alabama in 1859.

In December 1860, Hale, who was Alabama's commissioner to State of Kentucky at the time, wrote to that state's governor of Alabama's justification for secession. In it, he voiced support for the Dred Scott decision, condemned the Republican Party, and stated that the state's secession, which would perpetuate slavery, was the only way to prevent prospective freedmen, whom Hale referred to as "half-civilized Africans", from raping southern "wives and daughters":

American Civil War
When the secession ordinance was passed, he was appointed commissioner to Kentucky by Governor Moore and delivered an able address before the legislation at Frankfort. That same year, he was elected to represent his district in the provisional congress of the Confederacy. While holding that position, he was chosen as a lieutenant colonel of the 11th Alabama Infantry Regiment, and repaired with it to Virginia. He remained with that command until after the battle of Seven Pines, when he was temporarily assigned to the Ninth Alabama regiment and led it into battle. The fall of Col. Moore obliged him to return to the Eleventh regiment, which he led  at the Battle of Gaines' Mill, sometimes known as the First Battle of Cold Harbor or the Battle of Chickahominy River on June 27, 1862, in Hanover County, Virginia.

This was the third of the Seven Days Battles (Peninsula Campaign, March–July 1862). Original documentation of the battle, at the National Archives, Washington DC, states "S.F. Hale, Lt. Col 11th Ala. Regt. Appears on a Report of casualties, of the 4th Brigade, Longstreet's Division, in the action at Gaines' Mill, Va., June 27, 1862, Remarks: Dangerously wounded".

Death
Hale died of wounds on July 18, 1862 at Richmond, after lingering for 22 days. He was laid to rest in Mesopotamia Cemetery (Oak Hill), Greene County, Alabama, Burial Row/Column 34/34. His tombstone bears the epitaph "Statesman, Jurist, Patriot, Soldier & Christian Gentleman"

Legacy
Hale County, Alabama (established 1867), is named after him.

References

External links

 
 Stephen F. Hale at The Political Graveyard

1818 births
1862 deaths
19th-century American politicians
Burials in Alabama
Confederate States Army officers
Confederate States of America military personnel killed in the American Civil War
Deputies and delegates to the Provisional Congress of the Confederate States
Hale County, Alabama
Members of the Alabama House of Representatives
People from Crittenden County, Kentucky
People from Eutaw, Alabama
Signers of the Confederate States Constitution
Signers of the Provisional Constitution of the Confederate States
United States politicians killed during the Civil War